The Metalor Group, previously Métaux Précieux SA Metalor, founded in 1852, is a subsidiary of Japan's Tanaka Kikinzoku Group. Metalor has become one of the major world suppliers of precious metals related products & procedures. It makes a wide array of alloys, especially for the watch and jewellery industry, supplying many of the Swiss watch brands, although it has expanded its activities far beyond its primary sector.

History 
The roots of the company go back to the "preparatory rolling mill" founded in 1852 by Martin de Pury & Cie in Le Locle. This specialized in smelting gold and manufacturing watch cases. In 1864, the plant, which had five employees at the time, was taken over by the Banque du Locle.

In 1918 the company became the property of the Swiss Bank Corporation. Operations have expanded to refining precious metals and producing bullion. In 1936, the bank association founded Métaux Précieux S.A. Metalor in Le Locle. As a result, production activities were initially expanded at the Neuchâtel site and later in other countries. 

The group’s Hong Kong refinery opened in 1982, and Metalor began running its US refinery in 1986. In 1998, SBC merged with Union Bank of Switzerland (UBS) and a majority of the shares of Métaux Précieux SA Metalor were acquired from SBC by a group of Swiss private investors comprising Ernst Thomke, Martin Bisang, Rolf Soiron and Giorgio Behr. The refinery group changed name from “Métaux Précieux SA Metalor” to “Metalor Technologies” in 2001. 

In September 2016, 100% of Metalor was sold to the Japanese group of precious metals producers Tanaka Kikinzoku. Previously, the French investor Astorg Partners, who took over Metalor in 2009, held a majority of 50.5% of the shares.

Spinoff

Metalor Dental
Metalor Dental had not been integrated into the Metalor Group : it has now, dating January 1, 2009, been merged into Cendres & Métaux, Biel/Bienne, Switzerland.

Sale
In September 2016, Metalor Metals was sold to Tanaka Kikinzoku Group of Japan.

References

Further reading
Info Page on Metalor
PDF Info Page on Metalor Group
Gold & Silver IRA Companies Review
European Chamber of Commerce Taipei

External links

Answers.com Metalor U.S.A.

Precious metals
Precious metal alloys
Horology
Bullion dealers
Manufacturing companies of Switzerland